Prandau-Normann Castle or Valpovo Castle is a palace or castle in Valpovo, Croatia. It was owned by the noble Prandau-Normann family from the baroque period.

References

Castles in Croatia
Buildings and structures in Osijek-Baranja County